Yuvraaj Parashar is an Indian Bollywood model and film actor who starred in India's first homosexual film, Dunno Y... Na Jaane Kyon (Don't Know Why) (2010). His parents have taken legal action to disown him because of the film, despite winning acclaim from Deputy Chief Minister of Maharashtra Chhagan Bhujbal for their portrayal of bisexual men. Parashar is originally from Agra in India. Dunno Y... Na Jaane Kyun got 11 international awards including best actors and best film.

Filmography
 2008 - Fashion as Gaurav
 2010 - Dunno Y Na Janne Kyun as Ashley
 2015 - Dunno Y2... Life is a Moment as Ashley
 2016 - Love Life & Screw Ups as Arjun
 2018 - The Past as Yuvraj Malhotra
 2019 -  Moksh to Maya
 2019 -   Sajda,  Music single 
 2019 -   Mehroo, Music single 
 2019 -   Atharva, Music single
 2020 -  The Last Breath, Music single 
 2020 - Love life & Screw Ups season 02 as Arjun 
 2021 - Lights camera MURDER as Avinash Kapoor
 2021 Bahaar as writer n director 
 2021 Kesar as writer n director 
 2021 Ahsaas as Farhad (lead actor)

References

Further reading

External Links

Living people
Indian gay actors
Indian LGBT entertainers
Male actors in Hindi cinema
People from Agra
Year of birth missing (living people)